Elections to Liverpool City Council were held on Wednesday 1 November 1922.

One third of the council seats were up for election. The term of office for each councillor being three years.

Thirteen of the thirty-six seats up for election were uncontested.

After the election, the composition of the council was:

Election result

Ward results

* - Retiring Councillor seeking re-election

Comparisons are made with the 1919 election results, as the retiring councillors were elected then.

Abercromby

Aigburth

Anfield

Breckfield

Brunswick

Castle Street

Dingle

Edge Hill

Everton

Exchange

Fairfield

Fazakerley

Garston

Granby

Great George

Kensington

Kirkdale

Little Woolton

Low Hill

Netherfield

North Scotland

Old Swan

Prince's Park

Sandhills

St. Anne's

St. Domingo

St. Peter's

Sefton Park East

Sefton Park West

South Scotland

The death of Councillor John O'Shea (Irish Nationalist, elected 1 November 1919) occurred on 28 October 1922, three days before his term of office was due to expire.

Vauxhall

Walton

Warbreck

Wavertree

Wavertree West

West Derby

Aldermanic Elections

Aldermanic Election 7 February 1923

Caused by the death of Alderman Richard Dart
(Conservative, last elected as an alderman 9 November 1913) Councillor John Edwards (Conservative, Old Swan, elected 1 November 1921) was elected by the councillors as an alderman on 7 February 1923.

Aldermanic Election 7 March 1923

Caused by the death of Alderman Louis Samuel Cohen 
(Conservative, last elected as an alderman 9 November 1913). In his place Councillor Thomas Dowd (Conservative Fairfield, elected 1 November 1921), Fruit Merchant of "Meadowside", Mount Road, Upton, Wirral was elected by the councillors as an alderman on 7 March 1923.

By-elections

No. 29 Anfield, 17 January 1923

Caused by the resignation of Councillor William Owen Thomas (Liberal, Anfield, elected 1 November 1920) which was reported to the Council on 3 January 1923

No. 32 Old Swan, Tuesday 20 February 1923

Following the death of Alderman Richard Dart (Conservative, last elected as an alderman 9 November 1913) Councillor John Edwards (Conservative, Old Swan, elected 1 November 1921) was elected by the councillors as an alderman on 7 February 1923 
.

No. 31 Fairfield, 21 March 1923

Caused by the election by the Council of Councillor Thomas Dowd (Conservative, Fairfield, elected 1 November 1921) as an alderman on 7 March 1922.

No. 33 Wavertree West, Tuesday 15 May 1923

Caused by the resignation of Councillor Sidney Stanley Dawson (Conservative, Wavertree West, elected  1 November 1921) was reported to the Council on 2 May 1923.

No. 7 Castle Street, 21 June 1923

Caused by the death of Councillor Benjamin Cookson (Party?, Castle Street, elected 1 November 1920) on 7 May 1923.

No. 31 Fazakerley, 

Caused by the death of Councillor Matthew Leitch (Conservative, Fazakerley, elected 1 November 1920) on 9 May 1923.

No. 22 Netherfield, Tuesday 31 July 1923

Caused by the death of Councillor William Ball (Conservative, Netherfield, elected 1 November 1920) on 3 July 1923.

See also

 Liverpool City Council
 Liverpool Town Council elections 1835 - 1879
 Liverpool City Council elections 1880–present
 Mayors and Lord Mayors of Liverpool 1207 to present
 History of local government in England

References

1922
1922 English local elections
1920s in Liverpool